Red Rover is a children's game.

Red Rover or Red Rovers may also mean:

Arts and entertainment
The Red Rover, an 1827 novel by James Fenimore Cooper
Red Rover, a 2018 Canadian science fiction romantic comedy film
"Red Rover", a track from the album Sleeper by the alternate rock band Tribe
"Red Rover", a track from the album Say You Will by the British/American rock band Fleetwood Mac
Red Rover Studios, an animation studio owned by House of Cool Studios

Ships
, a steamer captured by the Union Navy during the American Civil War and used as a hospital ship
Red Rover (clipper), two clipper ships, one launched in 1830, the other in 1852

Sports teams
Red Rovers, a former association football team - see History of association football in Brisbane, Queensland
Red Rovers, the sports teams of Easton Area High School, Pennsylvania

Other uses
The Red Rovers or Alabama Red Rovers, a military unit that fought in the Texas Revolution
RedRover (organisation), USA, animal rescue organization formerly known as United Animal Nations
Red rover, the common name of the fish Emmelichthys ruber
Red Rover, a robotic spacecraft developed by Astrobotic Technology

See also
"Red Rover, Red Rover", an episode of The Mentalist (season 4)
Red and Rover, a comic strip by Brian Basset

